Blue Blood is an extant 1925 American silent comedy drama film produced and distributed by Chadwick Pictures and starring George Walsh. Scott R. Dunlap directed.

Plot
As described in a film magazine review, Leander Hicks wants his daughter Geraldine to marry Percy Horton, supposedly a malted milk millionaire. She refuses. At a resort Gerry falls in love with scientist Bob Chester. Then it is revealed that Horton is actually a rum-runner. His men grab Bob, mistaking him for a revenue officer, but he is able to escape. Hounded by detectives, Horton makes a getaway using a yacht with Gerry and her father onboard. Bob boards the vessel, whips Horton, and fights the crew. The police arrive in time to catch and break up the gang. The two lovers are reunited.

Cast

Preservation
A print of Blue Blood is held by French archive Archives du Film du CNC (Bois d'Arcy).

References

External links

1925 films
American silent feature films
Films based on short fiction
American black-and-white films
Films directed by Scott R. Dunlap
1920s American films